Tabant is a small town and rural commune in Azilal Province, Béni Mellal-Khénifra, Morocco. At the time of the 2014 census, the commune had a total population of 14,963 people living in 2194 households.

References

Populated places in Azilal Province
Rural communes of Béni Mellal-Khénifra